Helman is a surname. Notable people with the surname include:

Abel Helman, American pioneer of Ashland, Oregon
Albert Helman, pseudonym of politician, playwright and poet Lou Lichtveld
Abraham Helman (1907–1952), Canadian chess master
Harry Helman, Canadian professional ice hockey player
Josh Helman, Australian television and film actor
Nathaniel T. Helman (1905–1993), New York politician and judge
Pablo Helman, Argentine visual effects artist
Reuven Helman, weightlifting champion
Scott Helman, Canadian singer-songwriter
Zeydl Shmuel-Yehuda Helman, Romanian songwriter and journalist
Zofia Helman, Polish musicologist

See also
Helman Glacier, a tributary glacier in the Admiralty Mountains of Antarctica
Helman Tor, a tor in mid Cornwall, England
Hellman
Hellmann